Haminoea is a genus of medium-sized sea snails or bubble snails, marine opisthobranch gastropod molluscs in the family Haminoeidae, the haminoea bubble snails, part of the clade Cephalaspidea, the headshield slugs and bubble snails.

Systematics
Three different spellings (Haminoea, Haminea, Haminaea) were used for this genus over two hundred years. The ICZN finally made a decision that the correct spelling is Haminoea.

Oskars et al. (2019) restricted Haminoea to species from the Atlantic and eastern Pacific, and resurrected Haloa and Lamprohaminoea for Indo-Pacific species.

Description
Many species within this genus have green algae growing on their shells. The posterior tip of the headshield is bilobed, except in Haminoea elegans.

Species
Species within the genus Haminoea include:
Haminoea alfredensis P. Bartsch, 1915 - Distribution: South Africa, Length: 9–17 mm, Description: has a broad radular ribbon with about 40 teeth in each half row; translucent greenish color, dotted with yellow to orange spots.
Haminoea ambigua (A. Adams, 1850)
Haminoea angelensis F. Baker & G. D. Hanna, 1927 - Distribution: Gulf of California, Mexico, Length: 7 mm.
Haminoea antillarum d'Orbigny, 1841 - Antilles Glassy-bubble, Antilles Paper-bubble - Distribution: Florida, Caribbean, Brazil. Length: 12–20 mm.
Haminoea antillarum guadaloupensis Sowerby II, 1868 - Distribution : Florida, Cuba, Guadeloupe, Length: 12–18 mm, Description: globose shell with greenish yellow color, covered with longitudinal striae (= stripes); mantle with white  to greenish background with small black dots.
 Haminoea binotata Pilsbry, 1895 
Haminoea cyanocaudata Heller & Thompson, 1983
Description : translucent with green color (caused by growths of green algae), mottled with lightbrown spots, outlined in white, and darker brown dots; There can be a wide variation in the color pattern. This species is fairly uncommon, but, when found, it is always in large aggregations.
Haminoea cymbiformis Carpenter, 1856
Distribution : Mexico
Haminoea elegans Gray, 1825 Atlantic Elegant Paper Bubble; Elegant Glassy Bubble
Distribution : West Africa, Florida, Caribbean, Venezuela, Colombia, Brazil
Length : 23.5 mm
Description : found at depths up to 34 m; translucent mantle with patches of  brown and black; posterior end of the headshield is not bilobed; shell with spiral grooves.
Haminoea exigua Schaefer, 1992
 Haminoea flavescens (A. Adams, 1850)
Haminoea fusari Alvarez, E.F.García, & Villani, 1993
Haminoea fusca Pease, 1863
Distribution : Indo-Pacific
Length : 25 mm
Description : color of the shell : varies from greenish to brown, and light purple.
Haminoea galba W. H. Pease, 1861
Distribution : Indo Pacific
Haminoea glabra A. Adams, 1850
Distribution : Yucatán, Panama
Length : 4.3 mm
Haminoea hydatis Linnaeus, 1758
Distribution : SW Britain, Ireland, France and south to the Mediterranean, Madeira and Canaries; Ascension Island, St. Helena, west coast of Africa
Length : 8–30 mm (shell : 15 mm)
Description : fragile shell hidden by the  mantle and parapodial lobes in crawling animals. Herbivorous swimming dark brown snail found on muddy sands, shell grit and algae fields, down to unknown depths.
Haminoea japonica Pilsbry, 1895
Haminoea margaritoides Kuroda & Habe, 1971 - Distribution: Japan, Length: 7 mm

Haminoea navicula da Costa, 1778 - Distribution: SW Britain, south to the Mediterranean, Ascension Island, St. Helena; Atlantic and Mediterranean costas of France and Spain; Black Sea, Length: up to 70 mm (shell: 32 mm), Description: larger species, with heavier and darker-white shell; cephalic shield with short tentacular processes at front. Found on muddy sands especially among Eelgrass, Zostera marina. Does not swim. This species is able to change its color to correspond with its environment. The color pigments (or melanophores) in the skin can be obscured. The skin color can change in this way from dark brown to white in four to five hours. (Edlinger, Malacologia 22; 1982)
Haminoea orbignyana A. de Férussac, 1822 
Distribution : France to West Africa; Mediterranean, Eastern Atlantic
Length : 7 mm
Haminoea orteai F. G. García Talavera, Murillo, & Templado, 1987
Distribution : Southern Spain
Haminoea padangensis Thiele, 1825 Padang’s Delicate Bubble
Distribution : West-Pacific
Length : 11 mm
Haminoea peruviana d'Orbigny, 1842
Distribution : Peru
Length : 11 mm
Haminoea petersi (Martens, 1879)
Haminoea petitii d'Orbigny, 1841 Straight Glassy-bubble 
Distribution: Caribbean, Florida, Colombia, Brazil
Length : 12 mm
Haminoea solitaria T. Say, 1822 Solitary Glassy-bubble, Say’s Paper-bubble, Solitary Paper-bubble
Distribution : Canada, Massachusetts to Florida
Length : 8–19 mm
Description : common bubble snail; oblong smooth shell; bluish-white to yellowish-brown.
Haminoea succinea (T.A. Conrad, 1846) Amber Glassy-bubble
Distribution : caribbean, Florida, Colombia, Venezuela, Bermuda
Length : 12 mm
 Haminoea templadoi Garcia, Perez-Hurtado & Garcia-Gomez, 1991
 Haminoea tenella (A. Adams in Sowerby, 1850)
Haminoea tenera A. Adams, 1850
Distribution : Australia
Haminoea vesicula A. A. Gould, 1855  Blister Glassy-bubble, White Paper-bubble, Gould’s Paper-bubble
Distribution : West America, Alaska, Gulf of California, Mexico
Length : 19 mm
Description : common on muddy flats and on eelgrass; the middle posterior part of the cephalic shield has an indent; brown or greenish-yellowy shell; large, barrel-shaped body whorl covered by a rust periostracum; involute (= sunken) spire; long aperture; outer lip gradually increasing in width; the snail cannot retract completely into its shell.
Haminoea virescens Sowerby, 1833 Green Glassy-bubble, Green Paper-bubble, Sowerby’s Paper-bubble
Distribution : Northwestern America from Puget Sound (Seattle) to Gulf of California.
Length : 13–19 mm
Description : Thin, fragile shell is ovate and yellowish-green; involute (= sunken) spire, with small perforation; body whorl with longitudinal growth ridges and minute grooves; large aperture; thin outer lip
Haminoea wallisi Gray, 1825
Distribution : Australia
Distribution : New Zealand
Length : 30 mm (shell : 20 mm)
Description : very common; translucent snail with variable coloring, going from pale color with black dots, to a uniform black color; broad headshield; parapodia fold up and envelop most of the shell; thin, ovate translucent shell.
 Species brought into synonymy
 Haminoea angusta Gould, 1859:synonym of Cylichnatys angusta (Gould, 1859)
 Haminoea callidegenita (Gibson & Chia, 1989):synonym of Haminoea japonica Pilsbry, 1895 Distribution: West America, Description: has a deeply bifurcate headshield.
 Haminoea cornea (Lamarck, 1822):synonym of Haminoea navicula (da Costa, 1778)
 Haminoea crocata Pease, 1860:synonym of Haloa crocata (Pease, 1860)
 Haminoea curta A. Adams, 1850: synonym of Liloa curta (A. Adams, 1850)
 Haminoea cymbalum Quoy & Gaimard, 1833:synonym of Lamprohaminoea cymbalum (Quoy & Gaimard, 1833)
 Haminoea cymoelium Monterosato, 1917:synonym of Haminoea hydatis (Linnaeus, 1758)
 Haminoea cyanomarginata Heller & Thompson, 1983:synonym of Lamprohaminoea cyanomarginata (Heller & Thompson, 1983)
 Haminoea grisea E.A. Smith, 1875:synonym of Cylichna alba (Brown, 1827)
 Haminoea maugeansis Burn, 1966:synonym of Papawera maugeansis (Burn, 1966)
 Haminoea natalensis C. F. Krauss, 1848:synonym of Haloa natalensis (Krauss, 1848)
 Haminoea ovalis Pease, 1868:synonym of Haloa ovalis (Pease, 1868)
 Haminoea taylorae E. J. Petuch, 1987:synonym of Haminoea elegans (Gray, 1825)
 Haminoea zelandiae Gray, 1843:synonym of Papawera zelandiae (Gray, 1843)

References

 Turton W. & Kingston J.F. 1830. The natural history of the District. In: N.T. Carrington, The Teignmouth, Dawlish and Torquay Guide, 2

Further reading 
 Powell A. W. B. (1979). New Zealand Mollusca. William Collins Publishers Ltd, Auckland, New Zealand, 
 Pownall G. (1979). New Zealand Shells and Shellfish. Seven Seas Publishing Pty Ltd, Wellington, New Zealand 1979 
 Vaught, K.C. (1989). A classification of the living Mollusca. American Malacologists: Melbourne, FL (USA). . XII, 195 pp.
 Gofas, S.; Le Renard, J.; Bouchet, P. (2001). Mollusca, in: Costello, M.J. et al. (Ed.) (2001). European register of marine species: a check-list of the marine species in Europe and a bibliography of guides to their identification. Collection Patrimoines Naturels, 50: pp. 180–213
 Gofas, S.; Afonso, J.P.; Brandào, M. (Ed.). (S.a.). Conchas e Moluscos de Angola = Coquillages et Mollusques d'Angola. [Shells and molluscs of Angola]. Universidade Agostinho / Elf Aquitaine Angola: Angola. 140 pp.
 Willan, R. (2009). Opisthobranchia (Mollusca). In: Gordon, D. (Ed.) (2009). New Zealand Inventory of Biodiversity. Volume One: Kingdom Animalia. 584 pp

External links 

 

 
Haminoeidae
Taxa named by William Turton
Gastropod genera